Xestipyge is a genus of clown beetles in the family Histeridae. There are at least 10 described species in Xestipyge.

Species
 Xestipyge conjunctum (Say, 1825)
 Xestipyge currax (Marseul, 1870)
 Xestipyge garbigliettii (Marseul, 1867)
 Xestipyge geminatum (J. E. LeConte, 1860)
 Xestipyge multistriatus (Lewis, 1888)
 Xestipyge ornatum (Reitter in Leder, 1881)
 Xestipyge puncticulatum Desbordes, 1919
 Xestipyge radulum (Marseul, 1862)
 Xestipyge simplex Vienna, 1993
Xestipyge skelleyi Warner, 2021

References

 Mazur, Slawomir (1997). "A world catalogue of the Histeridae (Coleoptera: Histeroidea)". Genus, International Journal of Invertebrate Taxonomy (Supplement), 373.

Say, Th (1825). "Description of new species of Hister and Hololepta, inhabiting the United States. Journal of the Academy of Natural Sciences of Philadelphia 5 : 32-47 (Xestipyge conjunctum).
 Marseul S.A.(1870). "Description d'espèces nouvelles d'histrides;Annales de la Société Entomologique de Belgique. 13 [1869-1870]: 55–158. (Xestipyge currax)
 Marseul S.A. (1867). Description d'espèces nouvellesde Buprestides et d'un histéride du genre Carcinops. Annales de la société Entomologique de France,(4) 7 : 47–56. (Xestipyge garbigliettii)
 LeConte J.L. (1859). The coleoptera of Kansas and Eastern New Mexico. Smithsonian Contributions to knowledge, 11: vi+58pp. (Xestipyge geminatum)
 Lewis G.(1887). Histeridae.Pp 182–255. In: Sharp D., Matthews A., Lewis G.,(eds) : Biologia Centrali-Americana. Insecta. Coleoptera. Vol II Part.1 London. (Xestipyge multisriatus)
 Reitter E.(1881)[new taxa]. In: Leder, H.Beitrag zur kaukasischen Käfer-fauna. Unter Mitwirkung von Dr.Eppelsheim in Grünstadt une Edmund Reitter in Wien. Verhandlungen der Kaiserlich-Königlichen Zoologisch-Botanischen Geselschaft in Wien, 30 [1880] : 501–518. (Xestipyge ornatum).
 Desbordes H.(1919) Description d'une nouvelle espèce de Xestipyge d'Asie Mineure (Col.Histeridae) Bulletin de la Société Entomologique de France. 1919 : 206-207 (Xestipyge puncticulatum).
 Marseul S.A(1862). Supplément à la monographie des histeridés (Suite). Annales de la Société Entomologique de France, (4)2 :5-48, 437–516. (Xestipyge radulum).
 Vienna P. (1993). Brevi considerazioni sul genere Xestipyge Marseul, 1862. e descrizione di una nuova specie del Malawi (Insescta, Coleoptera, Histeridae). Il naturalista Valtellinese - Atti del Museo Civico di Storia Naturale di Morbegno, 4 : 75-79 ( Xestipyge simplex)
 Warner B.William (2021). "A brief review of the world Xestipyge Marseul (Coleoptera : Histeridae : Dendrophilinae : Paromalini) with description of a new species from the southwestern USA.Insecta Mundi 0854 February 26, 2021.Center for systematic Entomology, Inc., Gainesville, FL. (Xestipyge skelleyi).

Further reading

 Arnett, R. H. Jr., M. C. Thomas, P. E. Skelley and J. H. Frank. (eds.). (21 June 2002). American Beetles, Volume II: Polyphaga: Scarabaeoidea through Curculionoidea. CRC Press LLC, Boca Raton, Florida .
 
 Richard E. White. (1983). Peterson Field Guides: Beetles. Houghton Mifflin Company.

 Bousquet Yves, Laplante Serge. Coleoptera Histeridae; THE INSECTS AND ARACHNIDS OF CANADA.PART 24. Ottawa 2006. NRC Research Press.

Histeridae